The Institute for Orthodox Christian Studies (IOCS) is a theological college in Cambridge, England. It works in collaboration with the University of Cambridge and Anglia Ruskin University and awards its degree programs through these universities. IOCS is the only Christian Orthodox institute for higher education in the UK and, beside the Department of Orthodox Theology at the University of Eastern Finland, the only academic institution teaching the Orthodox faith in English anywhere in western Europe. Along with other theological colleges in Cambridge, it is a member of the Cambridge Theological Federation. The institute adopts a holistic approach to learning that integrates academic study with a liturgical life.

Foundation and vision 
The idea of an Orthodox institute was conceived after Metropolitan Anthony of Sourozh was awarded an honorary doctorate in 1996 by the University of Cambridge. The institute was established and received the first admission of students in 1999. The declared aims of the institute, as expressed in its memorandum and articles of association, are "to advance religious and theological education, particularly of members of the Orthodox Church."

IOCS was founded 2 March 1999 as a registered charity and limited company in England and Wales. It became a member of the Cambridge Theological Federation in the same year. In 2012 the Orthodox Episcopal Assembly for Great Britain and Ireland recognised, approved and blessed IOCS as an educational centre and appointed one of its bishops, Metropolitan Kallistos Ware, to be the institute's first president. Concordant with the teaching at IOCS, he is also an advocate for teaching the Orthodox faith in English.

In 2013 the institute acquired its own premises in Palamas House on Chesterton High Street, Cambridge. Prior to this it was based in rented quarters at Wesley House, a Methodist theological college in Jesus Lane, Cambridge.

Organisation and administration 
As a pan-Orthodox foundation, the institute is not maintained by any one branch of the Orthodox Church. It is supported by donations from a number of educational trusts and benefactors.

Biannual meetings of company members elect the chairman and directors. The directors also serve as trustees of the charity. The directors select a treasurer and a secretary for the company and appoint the principal, to whom is entrusted the day-to-day management of the institute with the advice of an executive committee of the board comprising the principal, the chairman of the board and the treasurer. Since 2012 the institute has also had a president, who is appointed by the Orthodox Episcopal Assembly for Great Britain and Ireland and serves as a liaison between the institute and the Assembly of Bishops. The first appointed president was Metropolitan Kallistos Ware, who is acting today.

Educational programs 
A wide range of courses are offered by the institute designed to facilitate inquiry and understanding of the Orthodox tradition at all levels from introductory courses in the Orthodox faith to specialist doctorate research projects. Current programs include:

 The Way - an introduction to the Orthodox faith
 Distance Learning Certificate in Orthodox Christian Studies
 Distance Learning Diploma in Orthodox Christian Studies

University courses 
Some courses and degree programs are provided in partnership with the University of Cambridge and Anglia Ruskin University:

 Certificate in Theology for Ministry (CTM)
 Bachelor of Theology for Ministry (BTh)
 BA in Theology and Religious Studies
 MA in Pastoral Theology
 Master of Philosophy (MPhil)
 Doctor of Philosophy (PhD)

The institute also organises an annual series of conferences entitled Community Lecture Days. In 2014 the theme of the lectures was "Orthodoxy in the contemporary world".

Liturgical life 
Vespers is normally held in the institute library on Wednesdays evenings. As a pan-Orthodox house, the institute also encourages students to attach themselves to one of the other Orthodox congregations in Cambridge.

References 

Eastern Orthodox educational institutions
Eastern Orthodoxy in the United Kingdom
Institutions of the Cambridge Theological Federation